The Consensus 1984 College Basketball All-American team, as determined by aggregating the results of four major All-American teams.  To earn "consensus" status, a player must win honors from a majority of the following teams: the Associated Press, the USBWA, The United Press International and the National Association of Basketball Coaches.

1984 Consensus All-America team

Individual All-America teams

AP Honorable Mention:

 Mark Acres, Oral Roberts
 Richie Adams, UNLV
 Mark Alarie, Duke
 Steve Alford, Indiana
 Paul Anderson, Dartmouth
 Ron Anderson, Fresno State
 Victor Anger, Pepperdine
 Brett Applegate, BYU
 Charles Barkley, Auburn
 John Battle, Rutgers
 Chris Beasley, Arizona State
 Benoit Benjamin, Creighton
 Tommy Best, Saint Peter's
 Joe Binion, North Carolina A&T
 Cory Blackwell, Wisconsin
 Charlie Bradley, South Florida
 Adrian Branch, Maryland
 Mike Brown, George Washington
 Brian Burke, Dartmouth
 Steve Burtt, Iona
 Vernon Butler, Navy
 Tim Cain, Manhattan
 Tony Campbell, Ohio State
 Wayne Carlander, USC
 Joe Carrabino, Harvard
 Terry Catledge, South Alabama
 Roosevelt Chapman, Dayton
 Keith Cieplicki, William & Mary
 Steve Colter, New Mexico State
 Tyrone Corbin, DePaul
 Hank Cornley, Illinois State
 Tony Costner, Saint Joseph's
 Dell Curry, Virginia Tech
 John Devereaux, Ohio
 Tim Dillon, Northern Illinois
 Bruce Douglas, Illinois
 Joe Dumars, McNeese State
 Calvin Duncan, VCU
 Ken Epperson, Toledo
 LaVerne Evans, Marshall
 Kenny Fields, UCLA
 Vern Fleming, Georgia
 Jimmy Foster, South Carolina
 Derrick Gervin, UTSA
 Alton Lee Gipson, Florida State
 Marc Glass, Montana
 Carl Golston, Loyola–Chicago
 Keith Gray, Detroit
 Lancaster Gordon, Louisville
 Butch Graves, Yale
 A. C. Green, Oregon State
 Granger Hall, Temple
 Mark Halsel, Northeastern
 Terry Hairston, Houston Baptist
 Ron Harper, Miami (OH)
 Steve Harris, Tulsa
 Earl Harrison, Morehead State
 Carl Henry, Kansas
 Vince Hinchen, Boise State
 Dave Hoppen, Nebraska
 Alfredrick Hughes, Loyola–Chicago
 Jay Humphries, Colorado
 James Jackson, West Texas State
 Ralph Jackson, UCLA
 Joe Jakubick, Akron
 David Jenkins, Bowling Green
 Melvin Johnson, Charlotte
 Keith Jones, Stanford
 Harold Keeling, Santa Clara
 Steve Kite, Tennessee Tech
 Joe Kleine, Arkansas
 Jon Koncak, SMU
 Larry Krystkowiak, Montana
 Ralph Lewis, La Salle
 Karl Malone, Louisiana Tech
 Lenny Manning, Austin Peay
 Xavier McDaniel, Wichita State
 Ben McDonald, UC Irvine
 Forrest McKenzie, Loyola Marymount
 Tim McRoberts, Butler
 Kevin Mullin, Princeton
 Jay Murphy, Boston College
 Ronnie Murphy, Jacksonville
 Johnny Newman, Richmond
 Sam Norton, UT Arlington
 Kenny Patterson, DePaul
 Chuck Person, Auburn
 Paul Pickett, Saint Mary's
 John Price, Weber State
 Mark Price, Georgia Tech
 John Revelli, Stanford
 Jerry Reynolds, LSU
 Lamont Robinson, Lamar
 Ricky Ross, Tulsa
 Jim Rowinski, Purdue
 Bill Ryan, Princeton
 Detlef Schrempf, Washington
 Carey Scurry, Long Island
 Tom Sewell, Lamar
 Charlie Sitton, Oregon State
 George Singleton, Furman
 Lamont Sleets, Murray State
 Tom Sluby, Notre Dame
 Phil Smith, New Mexico
 Terence Stansbury, Temple
 Barry Stevens, Iowa State
 John Stockton, Gonzaga
 Bernard Thompson, Fresno State
 Otis Thorpe, Providence
 Regan Truesdale, The Citadel
 Jeff Turner, Vanderbilt
 Milt Wagner, Louisville
 Dwayne Washington, Syracuse
 Willie White, Chattanooga
 Mike Whitmarsh, San Diego
 Hot Rod Williams, Tulane
 Pete Williams, Arizona
 Kenny Wilson, Davidson
 Ricky Wilson, George Mason
 Efrem Winters, Illinois
 Randy Worster, Weber State
 Carlos Yates, George Mason

Academic All-Americans
On March 3, 1984 CoSIDA announced the 1984 Academic All-America team, with UNLV senior Danny Tarkanian as the leading vote-getter.

References

NCAA Men's Basketball All-Americans
All-Americans